Chaoyang may refer to the following:

Chaoyang, Cili, Zhangjiajie, Hunan Province
Chaoyang, Fujian, Zhangzhou, Fujian
Chaoyang, Liaoning, prefecture-level city
Chaoyang County, division of Chaoyang City, Liaoning
Chaoyang District (disambiguation)
Chaoyang railway station (disambiguation)
Chaoyang Subdistrict (disambiguation), for all such named subdistricts of cities
Chaoyang Town (disambiguation), for all such named towns
Chaoyang Township (disambiguation), for all such named townships
Chaoyang University of Technology, Taichung County, Taiwan

See also
Yang Chao (disambiguation) or Chao Yang